AGC Aerospace & Defense is the portfolio brand of Acorn Growth Companies, an operationally focused, middle market private equity firm investing exclusively in aerospace and defense opportunities.

AGC Aerospace & Defense, through its portfolio of companies, has become a global supplier of technologies, systems and services supporting commercial and military programs. Capabilities within the portfolio range from financing, engineering, and integration services to manufacturing, logistics, and aircraft modifications. AGC Aerospace & Defense is organized into four operating groups: AeroComposites, Finance, Integrated Defense, and Services.

All the companies were aligned under the AGC Aerospace and Defense umbrella in 2009. The companies support DoD directly or as subcontractors to OEMs or Tier 1 defense contractors.

Awards and recognition
In early 2010, Veracity Technology Solutions received the Aviation Week MRO of the Year award from Aviation Week.  The Oklahoma Technology Counsel profiled Veracity's non-destructive inspection (NDI) / non-destructive testing (NDT) solutions. In the spring of 2010, Valair Aviation was featured by a local news channel regarding their aircraft upgrade capabilities.

Recently, the AGC Finance group was highlighted in CorporateJetInvestor magazine.

Acorn Growth Companies
Acorn Growth Companies is an operationally focused, middle market private equity firm investing exclusively in aerospace and defense.

Portfolio

The firm operates its portfolio of companies under AGC Aerospace & Defense, a global supplier of technologies, systems and services supporting commercial and military programs. Capabilities within the portfolio range from financing, engineering, and integration services to manufacturing, logistics, and aircraft modifications.

All the companies were aligned under the AGC Aerospace and Defense umbrella in 2009. The companies support DoD directly or as subcontractors to OEMs or Tier 1 defense contractors.

Acquisitions
 Paul Fabrications (Paul Fabs, Now AGC AeroComposites Derby)
 Hill AeroSystems Inc. (Formerly Hill AeroSpace, Hill Stamping)
 Commuter Air Technology (CAT)
 Aerospace Products S.E. (APSE)
 Unitech Composites and Structures (Now AGC AeroComposites)
 Valair Aviation
 Integrated Composites, Inc. (Now AGC AeroComposites)
 Valair - Kirkpatrick Aviation
 Aerospheres (UK) Ltd
 Tods Composite Solutions (Now AGC AeroComposites)

Start-ups and new ventures
 Veracity Technology Solutions
 SinglePoint Financial
 Aircraft Logistics Group (ALG)

Locations
 Derby, UK
 Portland, UK
 Yeovil, UK
 Harrow, UK
 Hayden, Idaho
 Washington, D.C.
 Oklahoma City, Oklahoma
 Tulsa, Oklahoma
 Salt Lake City
 Huntsville, Alabama

References

External links 
 Brus, Brian. "Veracity soaring: Magazine names Tulsa firm MRO of the Year." Journal Record, The (Oklahoma City).  May 14, 2009. http://findarticles.com/p/articles/mi_qn4182/is_20100528/ai_n53871181/
 Oklahoma Technology Council.  http://www.oktechcouncil.com/tech_spotlight.php?archive=215
 Oklahoma State University "Sensor Companies in Oklahoma: Commuter Air Technology." Sensors: Sensor Industry in Oklahoma.  Vol. 3, No. 1, MMX. https://web.archive.org/web/20110213035804/http://vprtt.okstate.edu/index.php/research-communications/publications

Aerospace companies of the United States